Fath Vehicle Industries is an Iranian motor vehicle manufacturer.

History 
The company is based in Tehran, Iran, and is part of VIG Group (Vafa Doust Industrial Group). In 1995 Fath began production of SUVs . under the brand name Fath. In addition, the company manufactures military vehicles.

2000 — 100 passenger cars manufactured
2001 — 500 passenger cars manufactured
2002 — 750 passenger cars manufactured
2003 — 500 cars and 500 pick-ups delivered

Models

Sahand Cruiser
Sahand Cruiser

The Fath Sahand Cruiser is a license built Toyota Land Cruiser. The first version was a pickup. In 2000, the added combination Kian station the range. 2003 followed Cabriolet called convertible.

A diesel engine with 4000 cc displacement and 102 kW (137 hp ) drives the vehicles.

Fath Safir

The Jeep-like Safir is a military vehicle with all-wheel drive.

External links 

 d'Auto (niederländisch, retrieved 14 May 2016)

References 

Car manufacturers of Iran
Truck manufacturers of Iran
Manufacturing companies based in Tehran
Companies listed on the Tehran Stock Exchange
Iranian brands
Defence companies of Iran